"Voi avete un cor fedele", K. 217, is a concert aria by Wolfgang Amadeus Mozart for solo soprano and orchestra, composed in Salzburg, dated 26 October 1775. Written around the time of the composition of Mozart's five violin concertos. In this aria, the character Dorinda contemplates a new romantic partner.

A travelling Italian opera company visited Salzburg, and asked Mozart to write an insertion aria for the opera Le nozze di Dorinda, an opera buffa by the Italian composer Baldassare Galuppi. The text originated by the dramatist Carlo Goldoni, but it is unknown who adapted this aria text for Mozart. The scholar Stanley Sadie noted the aria is “substantial with ironic overtones, set in alternating slow and fast sections, shows a remarkable advance in comic aptitude in its gestures and its timing as compared with anything in La finta giardiniera", which was completed by Mozart a few months earlier. The aria was published by Breitkopf & Härtel in 1882. It remains a popular concert piece, often performed and recorded.

Description 

Sung by the character Dorinda, the aria is marked Andantino graziosa, then allegro, and consists of 126 bars in the key of G major. The vocal range reaches from D to B with an unusually high tessitura. A typical performance lasts for around seven minutes. The work calls for two oboes, two French horns and strings. The time signature for the Andantino graziosa is  triple metre, then for the allegro, common time . The aria contains scales and trills with bravura passages.

Text 
Voi avete un cor fedele,
Come amante appassionato:
Ma mio sposo dichiarato,
Che farete? cangerete?
Dite, allora che sarà?
Manterrete fedeltà?
Ah! non credo.
Già prevedo,
Mi potreste corbellar.
Non ancora,
Non per ora,
Non mi vuò di voi fidar.

You have a faithful heart,
like any impassioned lover;
but once my troth is plighted,
tell me, what will you do?
Will you change?
Will you remain faithful?
Ah, I cannot believe it!
It is already foretold,
you will make a fool of me.
Not yet, not for now will I trust in you.

Recordings

 1962 – Maria Stader (soprano), Camerata Salzburg, Bernhard Paumgartner – Deutsche Grammophon
 1981 – Edita Gruberová (soprano), Vienna Chamber Orchestra, György Fischer – Decca
 1983 – Edith Mathis (soprano), Mozarteum Orchestra Salzburg, Leopold Hager – Philips
 1989 – Felicity Lott (soprano), London Mozart Players, Jane Glover – Decca
 1990 – Emma Kirkby (soprano), Academy of Ancient Music, Christopher Hogwood – L'Oiseau-Lyre
 1992 – Edita Gruberová (soprano), Chamber Orchestra of Europe, Nikolaus Harnoncourt – TELDEC
 2016 – Regula Mühlemann (soprano), Kammerorchester Basel, Umberto Benedetti Michelangeli – Sony Classical

References

External links
  
 
 Italian text
 , Cecilia Bartoli, Concentus Musicus Wien, conductor Nikolaus Harnoncourt
 , Lucia Popp, Mozarteum Orchester Salzburg, conductor Leopold Hager

Arias by Wolfgang Amadeus Mozart
Soprano arias
1775 compositions
Compositions in G major